Hafizabad can refer to:

 Hafizabad, India
 Hafizabad, Iran
 Hafizabad, Pakistan